Kenneth Daniel Hebert (born c. 1947) is a former American football player.  He played for the Houston Cougars football team from 1965 to 1967.  In 1966, he caught 38 passes for 800 yards and 11 touchdowns. He also kicked 41 points after touchdown and two field goals to lead the NCAA major colleges in scoring with 113 points. He was selected by the Pittsburgh Steelers in the third round of the 1968 NFL Draft and appeared in three games for the Steelers during the 1968 NFL season. He was inducted into the University of Houston Hall of Honor in 1977.

See also
 List of NCAA major college football yearly receiving leaders
 List of NCAA major college football yearly scoring leaders

References

American football ends
Houston Cougars football players
Pittsburgh Steelers players
Players of American football from California
Sportspeople from San Bernardino, California
American football wide receivers
1940s births
Living people
Houston Cougars baseball players